Aristobulus Minor or Aristobulus the Younger (flourished 1st century BC and 1st century AD, died after 44) was a prince from the Herodian Dynasty. He was of Jewish, Nabataean and Edomite ancestry.

He was the youngest son born to prince Aristobulus IV and princess Berenice of Judea. His parents were first cousins and thus Aristobulus was a grandson to Herod the Great.

When growing up, he was educated along with his eldest brothers, Agrippa I and Herod of Chalcis in Rome, along with future Roman Emperor Claudius. Claudius and Aristobulus became friends and he became in high favor with the future emperor. Claudius and Aristobulus had sent letters to each other.

Aristobulus lived at enmity with Agrippa I. Aristobulus denounced Agrippa I and forced him to leave from the protection of Flaccus, the Proconsul of Syria. Agrippa I was charged with bribing the Damascenes to support their cause with the Proconsul against the Sidonians.

Aristobulus married Iotapa, a Syrian Princess from the Royal family of Emesa and daughter of King Sampsiceramus II and Queen Iotapa who ruled Emesa from 14-42. This marriage for Aristobulus was a promising marriage in dynastic terms. Iotapa and Aristobulus chose to live as private citizens in the Middle East. Iotapa and Aristobulus had a daughter called Iotapa, who was deaf and mute. Apart from their daughter, they had no further descendants.

In the reign of Emperor Caligula 37-41, Aristobulus had opposed the emperor in setting up statues of himself in the Temple in Jerusalem. He survived his brother Agrippa I, who died in 44.

Family tree

Sources
-

1st-century BCE Jews
1st-century Jews
Herodian dynasty
Emesene dynasty